James Boothby Burke Roche, 3rd Baron Fermoy (28 July 1851 – 30 October 1920), was a Member of Parliament in the British House of Commons, and he held a title in the Peerage of Ireland during the final two months of his life. He was a great-grandfather of Diana, Princess of Wales.

Early life and career
He was born in 1851 at Twyford Abbey, Middlesex, the son of Edmond Roche, 1st Baron Fermoy, and his wife Eliza Caroline née Boothby. He was educated at Trinity College, Cambridge.

In 1896, he stood as an Anti-Parnellite Irish National Federation candidate in the Kerry East by-election for a seat in the Parliament of the United Kingdom. The Nationalists had split into two factions after the party leader, Charles Stewart Parnell, was named as co-respondent in a divorce. Roche was supported initially by both the Parnellite Irish National League and the Anti-Parnellite Irish National Federation, until it was revealed that he was himself divorced. During the campaign, Roche denied publicly that he knew of the divorce or that he had deserted his wife and children. Although he went on to win the seat, the opposing Unionist candidate gained the highest vote ever recorded for a Unionist candidate in Kerry East. He served one term and did not stand in the following general election in 1900.

Personal life
He visited the United States, where he met the heiress Frances Ellen Work (1857–1947).  Shortly thereafter, on 22 September 1880, they married at Christ Church, New York City.  The marriage was not a success, and they separated in December 1886. She was granted a divorce on the grounds of desertion on 3 March 1891 at Wilmington, Delaware.

Together, they had four children (two daughters, then twin sons):
 Eileen Roche (1882−1882), who died in infancy.
 The Hon. Cynthia Roche (1884−1966), who married firstly Arthur Scott Burden (1879–1921) in 1906. After his death, she married Guy Fairfax Cary  (1879–1950) in 1922.
 Maurice Roche, 4th Baron Fermoy (1885–1955), who was the maternal grandfather of Diana, Princess of Wales.
 The Hon. Francis George Burke Roche (1885–1958), who died unmarried.

In 1899, he sued his ex-wife with a Writ of Habeas Corpus to produce their daughter in court, stating that she was depriving "the child of her liberty." The case was settled out of court shortly thereafter.

On 1 September 1920, he succeeded his elder brother as Baron Fermoy. Just two months later, he died at Artillery Mansions, Westminster, London, aged 69. He was buried at St. Marylebone Cemetery in East Finchley on 3 November 1920.

Descendants
Through his son Maurice, he was the great-grandfather of Diana, Princess of Wales. His daughter Cynthia was the matrilineal great-grandmother of American actor Oliver Platt.

References

1851 births
1920 deaths
UK MPs 1895–1900
UK MPs who inherited peerages
Anti-Parnellite MPs
Irish Parliamentary Party MPs
Members of the Parliament of the United Kingdom for County Kerry constituencies (1801–1922)
People from Ealing
Alumni of Trinity College, Cambridge
English people of Irish descent
Barons Fermoy
James
Burials at East Finchley Cemetery
Younger sons of barons